Mohanpur is an Indian village in the mithila region of Bihar. It is about 4 kilometres away from the district headquarters Madhubani.

Demographics 
Maithili is the Local Language here.

Culture 
The major festival of this area is Chhath Puja in which people offer prayers to Lord Sun. Holi, Diwali, Dussehra, Makar Sankranti and Christmas are celebrated.

Transportation 
Bus services are available here for the district headquarters Madhubani and various other famous places in the region.

References 

Villages in Madhubani district